Alan Hilburg is an American communications and branding consultant. Hilburg specializes in crisis management, litigation and organizational brand alignment. Hilburg has worked on 107 trials and over 200 global crisis cases and branding campaigns beginning in 1982 for companies like Tylenol and more recently with the U.S. Veterans Administration. He has also worked in various industries including the tobacco industry (in which he created the Under 18—No Tobacco strategy),  transportation, hospitality, environmental industries, chemical, healthcare and education sectors. Hilburg has over 30 years of experience as a communications strategist consultant, and has also written to two New York Times best selling books and produced several documentaries. He has been described by the London Times as being a "leading corporate brand architect," and The New York Times has referred to him as the "Red Adair of corporate crisis management."

Education
Hilburg attended Franklin College in Indiana and graduated from New York Institute of Technology (NYIT). He also holds a master's degree in organizational behavior.

Career
After working as a senior executive with Burson-Marsteller, Hilburg established his own branding and consulting firm called Hilburg and Associates in 1987. Later, his company was acquired by Porter Novelli, a division of Omnicom Group, in 2002. The acquisition led to the creation of a new division called PNConsulting in which Hilburg carried on as president and CEO.

Hilburg has been behind national marketing and branding campaigns such as Wendy's "Where's the beef?," General Electric's "Bringing Good Things to Life," and AT&T's Olympic Torch Run.

Aside from his career in marketing and crisis management, Hilburg has also co-authored two New York Times Best Selling books: Russell Rules...Eleven Lessons on Leadership from the Greatest Winner of the Twentieth Century with former Boston Celtics Hall of Fame player Bill Russell and W. F. Rockwell's Twelve Hats of a Company President. Hilburg was the executive producer of the HBO documentary featuring Russell. Hilburg was also the executive producer of the first environmental film and second IMAX movie "Living Planet", which received an Academy award nomination, and also the executive producer of the PBS Special, "New Sweden."

Alan Hilburg has not only wrote two books on his journey in management consulting but has also been developing and creating software which is used to measure involvement and actions within organizations. The software he has created has been used to measure specific factors such as employee involvement, distrust, and decision making in cultures. Alan Hilburg stresses communication as a significant piece of success in companies, and he was able to partner up with Hong Kong PR Network to talk about how strategic communications is relevant to businesses. transitions specifically around crises and litigation. He was able to be sponsored by VMAGROUP and Alan spoke with VMAGROUP’s global head of marketing where he discussed his career, the communications industry, and some hard earned wisdom.

Crisis management consulting
Hilburg is known for aiding brands and individuals during times of crisis and litigation transitions. He has been the recipient of six Silver Anvil Awards for international communications excellence and five Clios for his advertising campaigns.

Hilburg is also an accredited (APR) member of Public Relations Society of America (PRSA) and is an international speaker on the relationship of trust to branding, crisis management and litigation communications.

Alan Hilburg discusses the important factors that makes his consulting successful and how he has advanced companies and individuals. Alan Hilburg stresses the significance of being more of a profit center then a cost center. It stems from communications and more specifically the role that communication involves in business practices and decisions. Alan Hilburg says that in his consulting, he acknowledges that communication “is an integrated business function, contributing to the overall success of a business by helping various organizational assets be even more effective in connecting and influencing 'their' stakeholders.” In order to have success and reach goals within an organization, communication is a key ingredient.

References

External links
 Alan Hilburg, 10th Anniversary of LSPR (VIDEO)
 Biography at PRSA St. Louis

American chief executives
Branding consultants
Living people
Year of birth missing (living people)